= National Artificial Intelligence Committee =

South Korean government committee

- 국가인공지능위원회

Agency overview
- Formed: 26 September 2024
- Agency executives: Lee Jae-myung, Chairman; Yeom Jae-ho, Vice Chairman
- Website: Official website

The National Artificial Intelligence Committee (Korean: 국가인공지능위원회) is an advisory committee under the President of South Korea that deliberates and decides on overall artificial intelligence policy. It was launched in September 2024 as a public-private joint national AI policy control tower.

== History ==
On April 9, 2024, President Yoon Suk Yeol announced that he would promote the AI Semiconductor Initiative containing the national strategy for artificial intelligence, launched a presidential committee, and announced that he would invest 9.4 trillion won in AI industry by 2027 and create a fund worth 1.4 trillion won to support the growth of AI semiconductor innovative companies.

== Role ==
The National Artificial Intelligence Committee is a nationwide promotion system launched directly under the President, and is an upgraded version of the Artificial Intelligence Strategy Supreme Council (인공지능전략최고위협의회) launched in April 2024.

At the launching ceremony, President Yoon said, "The committee is the focal point of public-private cooperation that brings together core capabilities across the nation. The government will proactively improve regulations to ensure that copyright and personal information protection regulations do not become obstacles to innovation while protecting core values, and establish detailed strategies in all areas, including research and development, infrastructure, laws, and systems, and thoroughly implement them."
